Miss Cebu (formerly Miss Cebu Tourism in 1984 to 1999 and Binibining Cebu in 2018 to 2021) is the oldest running beauty pageant in Cebu, Philippines.
 

 
The reigning Binibining Cebu is Beatrice Luigi Gomez from San Fernando.

History 
The beauty pageant was held in Cebu City every January during the Sinulog Festival, and it was organized by the city government and the city tourism office. In 2017, the pageant has been held every October with a different name, title, and organization.

Titleholders

References

External links

Beauty pageants in Cebu
Culture of Cebu
Philippine awards
1984 establishments in the Philippines